Located Ellicott City in Howard County, Maryland, United States, Keewaydin Farm.

The Keewaydin Farm house is a wooden structure forming an off-center T arrangement built in 1912 on a ten-acre farm. The name came from The Song of Hiawatha. The home was built for Judge James Clark and his wife Alda Tyson Hopkins. The house became the first meeting site for the Ellicott City PTA, Howard County Health Department. The farm raised colts used in local shows and Doughoregan Manor. Groceries for the site were delivered onsite by horse and cart from the former Mayor of Ellicott City, Samuel J. Yates. Children raised at the site included Orphans court Judge John Clark, and Senator James Clark, Jr. The farm was expanded to 30 acres and later subdivided and reduced to 10 acres In 1998 owner Edward J. Brush attempted to convert the property to an 87-room group care facility. 10 remaining acres of the property and the house was transferred to the Howard County Conservancy.

See also
Clark's Elioak Farm

References

Houses in Howard County, Maryland
Buildings and structures in Ellicott City, Maryland
Houses completed in 1912
1912 establishments in Maryland